Knutzen is a surname. Notable people with this surname include:

Egill Knutzen (1914–1990), Norwegian fencer
Jan Knutzen (born 1943), Norwegian documentary filmmaker
Martin Knutzen (1713–1751), German philosopher
Matthias Knutzen, 17th-century German atheist
Thea Knutzen (1930–2016), Norwegian politician
William Knutzen (1913–1983), Norwegian ceramist
Eric Knutzen, (1961-), American renewable energy entrepreneur

See also
Knutzen Peak, a mountain of Ellsworth Land, Antarctica
Knutzon